The Rex Allen Arizona Cowboy Museum and Willcox Cowboy Hall of Fame, is a museum in Willcox, Arizona, United States. Rex Elvie Allen (1920-1999), born and raised 40 miles north of Willcox, was known as the "Arizona Cowboy" and "Mister Cowboy". Allen was an authentic cowboy. Allen was an American film and television actor, singer and songwriter. He became famous in the 1950s as one of the last singing cowboys, and as the narrator of many Disney nature and Western productions.

The museum includes photographs, movie posters, cowboy outfits, records, musical instruments and other memorabilia. Across the street from the museum is a bronze statue of Rex Allen. It features the memorabilia of local actor and singer Rex Allen. The Willcox Cowboy Hall of Fame features portraits of area old-time cowboys who worked in the ranch industry.

Hall of fame inductees
The hall of fame was started on September 10, 1983.

1983
 Kortsen, Ted
 Wien, Ray
 Busenbark, Bill
 Sanders, Ben
 Browning, Ernest
 Sommer, Harry

1984
 Hudson, Jim
 Wilson, Bert
 Moore, Larry

1985
 Gardner, Claud
 Warren, Mila
 Leon, Juan Sierra

1986
 Harris, H. L. "Butch"
 Adams, Lloyd

1987
 Saxon, Harry
 Riggs, Billie

1988
 Gardner, B. A.
 Page, G. W. "Boozer"
 Hurtado, Florencio "Lencho"

1989
 Byrd, Cecil M.
 Whelan, William "Billy" H
 Larsen, Sabina

1990
 Lane, Elvie
 Riggs, Brannick
 Hooker, Henry Clay
 Busenbark, Jack

1991
 DeBorde, Will
 Wear, W.D. "Dee" Jr.
 Martin, Caleb

1992
 Prude, Charles
 Ellis, Lyter
 Stansberry, Alfred

1993
 Cook, Mark
 Cook, Tay
 Salazar, Lupe
 Hall, Ned
 Lawson, Charles "Chuck"

1994
 Cooke, Calvin
 Wootan, J. Frank

1995
 Riggs, Lillian Erickson
 DeBorde, Edd
 Moore, Gus
 Riggs, Stark

1996
 Prestridge, William S. "Bill"
 Bull, Joseph Jackson "Joe"
 Kuykendall, Leslie R.
 Gillespie, Charles E.

1997
 Jernigan, A. A. "Dee"
 Allen, Horace
 Snure, Ben Jr.

1998
 McNair, Claude
 Baker, Monroe
 Dubois, Marcellus

1999
 Browning, Alvin
 Klump, John Sherman
 Byrd, Homer
 Tenney, Lyman

2000
 Klump, John Daniel
 Lawhon, Josie
 Harris, Dave
 Ayala, Val

2001
 Whelan, Eddie
 Cowan, William "Butterfly"
 Vindiola, Rocky
 Durham, Archie

2002
 Martin, Thomas Jensen
 Riggs, Paul William
 Fortenberry, Claude W.
 Cowan, Ralph C.

2003
 Gardner, Bert
 Pride, Benjamin "Tuffy"
 Wood, Jack

2004
 DeRacy, Bill
 Post, Clarence "C.E."
 Davenport, Jack
 Nelson, Jack

2005
 MacGaffin, John O.
 Monzingo, Peggy
 Sellman, Tom
 Moyer, Ed

2006
 Moorehead, Buck
 Lowrey, Dan
 Shannon, Les
 Davis, Sonny

2007
 Winkler, Bill
 Darnell, Fred
 Boss, Roy Oscar

2008
 Shores, Sonny
 Straub, Bob
 Todd, Larry

2009
 Klump, Karry "Keith"
 Moore, L.E. "Larry" Jr.
 Tunks, Jack
 Self, Jim

2010
 Kuykendall, Tom
 Burgess, Terry Lan McNair

2011
 Krentz, Rob
 Hudson, Marvin
 Dobson, H.C. (Jay)

2012
 Post, Jack
 Robbs, R.L.
 Bourne, Chad

2013
 Bowman, Lewis
 Telles, Fred

2014
 Monk, Edward
 Goodwin, Robert Sewell
 Brawley, Norman "Pete"

2015
 Glenn, Marvin
 Klump, Wayne

2016
 Kimble, Don
 Whelan, Joe

2017
 Edington, Gilbert S. "Sam"
 Glenn, Warner

2018
 Riggs, Ellerbe B.
 Searle, Ron

2019
 Cannon, Jo
 Tout, Jim

2020
 Kimble, Ralph B.
 Darnell, Billy

Source:

References

External links

 Official website

1989 establishments in Arizona
Awards established in 1989
Museums established in 1989
Cowboy halls of fame
Halls of fame in Arizona
Allen, Rex
Mass media museums in the United States
American West museums in Arizona
Museums in Cochise County, Arizona
Willcox, Arizona